Belinda Sinclair (born 16 September 1950) is a British actress known for several recurring television roles.

She was born in London, and was trained as an actress with the Arts Educational Schools, London and had early success on the stage. In the original stage run of The Rocky Horror Show, after the actress portraying Janet, Julie Covington, was badly injured in an accident and had to leave the production. Sinclair took over the role, and is featured on the original cast recording. She also appeared in Hair.

Sinclair has had several on-going television roles. Among these are Shelley (1979–84), in which she appeared alongside Hywel Bennett, and later the part of Fern Farmer in five's soap opera Family Affairs. She played the role of Fern Farmer from 1999 to autumn 2003 when her character was killed in a car accident.

External links

1950 births
Living people
English musical theatre actresses
English soap opera actresses
English stage actresses
English television actresses
Actresses from London
20th-century English actresses
21st-century English actresses
People educated at the Arts Educational Schools